Truevision, Inc. was a maker of digital video processing add-on boards for PC computers.  It was founded by Cathleen Asch, Carl Calabria, Joseph Haaf, Bryan Hunt, Brad Pillow, Joe Shepard and Jeff Walters and others when AT&T split off their Electronic Photography and Imaging Center (EPICenter) in 1987.  EPICenter was founded by Alan Wlasuk, Carl Calabria, Bryan Hunt, Brad Pillow, Joe Shepard and Jeff Walters. Located in Indianapolis, Indiana, Truevision was later acquired by monitor and graphics card maker RasterOps in Santa Clara, California.  RasterOps took on the Truevision name and retained the Indianapolis engineering team which continued producing ever more advanced products until 1999 when the company was finally acquired by its biggest competitor, Pinnacle Systems. Pinnacle Systems was later acquired by Avid Technology, who initially used the AT-Vista when they were a two-person startup company.

The administrative hierarchy of the company developed into a triumvirate shortly after its inception. Joseph Haaf became VP of Sales and Marketing, Carl Calabria was VP of engineering, Cathleen Asch was VP of Administration and Accounting. Each had equal voting power in corporate decisions-making. The company was privately held by employees until purchased by RasterOps in 1992.

Beginning as AT&T EPICenter with still-image frame grabber cards like the ICB (image capture board), Truevision Inc. went on to pioneer the desktop digital video editing industry with the introduction of the TARGA videographics card in 1987.  Its engineers developed brand new ASICs that were eventually powerful enough to perform realtime operations on live video microscopy, which culminated in the TARGA 2000 digital video processing board in 1998. These HUB chips operated with a memory-centric architecture that simplified the task of third-party developers to integrate TARGA boards into their products.  Most notable were Japanese companies Sony and Matsushita (Panasonic), who used TARGA in the heart of several of their video editing workstations.

Multiple observation methods were supported, and the range of applications has been further increased.

Developments made at Truevision

Still Frame Video Teleconferencing

Developed by Bryan Hunt, this was a product using the ICB for still frame video teleconferencing.

RA-RAM

Row addressable DRAM. The development at AT&T that allowed the development of the VDA, ICB and Targa cards in the days before DRAM was fast enough for high pixel depth video frame buffer applications.

VIDI/O Workbench

A card and associated hardware that allowed for complex video waveform and vectorscope analysis and test pattern generation.

Fresco

One dynamic Truevision development was software, which peaked with the hiring of several software engineers to create programs that would show off the AT-Vista hardware to its largest advantage. These "utilities" were often handed to 3rd party software development companies to append or enhance existing applications. However, in 1988, a fully fleshed paint program was developed internally under the working name of Fresco by authors David Cook, Walter Wright, William Romanowski and Shawn Steiner. The complex software had capabilities which far exceeded many of the current paint packages of the day and in some cases had features which are still unrivaled. Fresco was never released.

See also
Truevision TGA
TrueVisions

References

External links
 http://www.truevision.com

Electronics companies of the United States
Film and video technology
Graphics hardware companies
Defunct software companies of the United States
Companies based in Indianapolis